Ramsheth Thakur is an Indian politician. He was elected to the Lok Sabha, lower house of the Parliament of India from Kolaba, Maharashtra as a member of the Peasants and Workers Party of India.

References

External links
  Official Biographical Sketch in Lok Sabha Website

India MPs 1998–1999
India MPs 1999–2004
Peasants and Workers Party of India politicians
Lok Sabha members from Maharashtra
1951 births
Marathi politicians
Living people
People from Raigad district